Kuseh may refer to:
 Kuseh, Golestan
 Kuseh, Sarpol-e Zahab, Kermanshah Province
 Kuseh, North Khorasan
 Kuseh, Bukan, West Azerbaijan Province
 Kuseh, Shahin Dezh, West Azerbaijan Province
 Kuseh, Yazd

See also
 Kusheh (disambiguation)